The Bach Prize of the Free and Hanseatic City of Hamburg has been awarded since 1951, since 1975 every four years. On the occasion of the 200th anniversary of the death of Johann Sebastian Bach, the prize was founded in 1950 by the Senate and the Hamburg Parliament. The prize is endowed with €10,000 and is awarded to composers, whose works would meet the demands of Bach. €5,000 are earmarked for scholarships.

Recipients

 1951 Paul Hindemith
 1954 Philipp Jarnach
 1957 Boris Blacher
 1960 Wolfgang Fortner
 1963 Johann Nepomuk David
 1966 Ernst Krenek
 1972 Helmut Lachenmann
 1975 György Ligeti
 1979 Olivier Messiaen
 1983 Hans Werner Henze
 1987 Aribert Reimann
 1992 Alfred Schnittke
 1995 Karlheinz Stockhausen
 1999 Wolfgang Rihm
 2003 Adriana Hölszky
 2007 Sofia Gubaidulina
 2011 Tan Dun
 2015 Pierre Boulez
 2019 Unsuk Chin

References

External links
 

Classical music awards
German music awards
Awards established in 1950
Johann Sebastian Bach